The 2013 Women's South American Hockey Championship was the 5th edition of the Women's South American Hockey Championship. It was held between 26 January and 2 February 2013 in Santiago, Chile.

Argentina won the tournament for the fifth time after defeating Chile 4–0 in the final. Uruguay won the bronze medal after defeating Brazil 4–1 in the third place match.

Umpires
The following umpires were appointed by the Pan American Hockey Federation to officiate the tournament:

Rosario Ardanaz (URU)
Camilia Cabargas (CHI)
Catalina Montesino Wenzel (CHI)
Megan Robertson (CAN)
Luciana Suarez (ARG)
Suzi Sutton (USA)
Veronica Villafañe (ARG)

Results

Pool matches

Classification matches

Fifth and sixth place

Third and fourth place

Final

Awards

Statistics

Final standings

References

South American Championship
International women's field hockey competitions hosted by Chile
South American Championship
Sports competitions in Santiago
2010s in Santiago, Chile
Women's South American Hockey Championship
2013 in Chilean women's sport